Euphorbia maculata, known as spotted spurge, prostrate spurge (not to be confused with Euphorbia prostrata), milk purslane, or spotted sandmat,  is a fast-growing annual plant in the family Euphorbiaceae. While it is native to North America, where it is a common garden and lawn weed in the United States, it has become a common introduced species throughout the world, including Europe, Japan, Korea, Australia, and New Zealand.

It grows in sunny locations and a variety of soils, and functions as a pioneer species in ecological succession. The sap of this plant is a mild skin irritant and can cause a rash in some people. The sap is poisonous and considered carcinogenic.

Description
The cyathia, bisexual reproductive structures unique to plants in the genus, are very small, with four white petal-like appendages that are sometimes pink.

The leaves are often marked with a reddish spot in the center, a feature that led to the common name of spotted spurge. It is similar to Euphorbia prostrata, but that species has shorter leaves that are more rounded at the tips. It may occasionally be confused with Euphorbia serpens but the very short and rounded leaves of E. serpens in combination with the larger (but still inconspicuous) cyathia should remove any potential for confusion.

References

External links 
Missouriplants: Euphorbia maculata 

maculata
Flora of North America
Plants described in 1753
Taxa named by Carl Linnaeus